The 49th Primetime Emmy Awards were held at the Pasadena Civic Auditorium in Pasadena, California in 1997. They were presented in two ceremonies hosted by Bryant Gumbel, one on Saturday, September 13 and another on Sunday, September 14. The September 14th ceremony was televised on CBS.

Frasier became the first series to win Outstanding Comedy Series four consecutive years, it joined Hill Street Blues which won Outstanding Drama Series four straight years a decade earlier. For the first time since 1979, James Burrows did not receive a Directing nomination, ending his run at 17 consecutive years. Beginning the following year, Burrows would begin a new streak that lasted another six years. In the drama field perennial nominee Law & Order won for its seventh season, the first time a show had won for this specific season.  In winning Law & Order became the first drama series that did not have serialized story arcs since Hill Street Blues perfected the formula. Law & Order remains the only non-serialized winner since 1981.

For the first time, not only did the Fox Network win the Lead Actress, Drama award, with Gillian Anderson, for The X-Files, but hers was also the network's first win in any of the Major Acting categories. (Laurence Fishburne and Peter Boyle won for Fox in only guest performances. The latter of which was for The X-Files just the year before.)

This ceremony marked the end of a 20-year residency for the Primetime Emmy Awards at the Pasadena Civic Auditorium dating back to the 29th Primetime Emmy Awards in 1977 ceremony.

This is the most recent year in which the Big Four Networks (ABC, CBS, FOX, and NBC) took home the top 14 Emmys (Comedy and Drama Series, Actor, Actress, Supporting Actor, Supporting Actress in Comedy and Drama, and Directing and Writing for Comedy and Drama).

The Larry Sanders Show had 16 nominations and zero wins, tying the record with Northern Exposure in 1993 and becoming the first (and only to date) comedy series to set the record. These records with later be broken by Mad Men in 2012 with 17 nominations and without a single win and The Handmaid's Tale in 2021 with 21 nominations and without a single win.

Winners and nominees

Programs

Acting

Lead performances

Supporting performances

Guest performances

Directing

Writing

Most major nominations
By network 
 NBC – 50
 HBO – 41
 CBS – 21
 ABC – 19

By program
 ER (NBC) – 14
 The Larry Sanders Show (HBO) – 12
 NYPD Blue (ABC) – 8
 Seinfeld (NBC) – 7
 Chicago Hope (CBS) / Frasier (NBC) / Mad About You (NBC) / Miss Evers' Boys (HBO) – 6

Most major awards
By network 
 NBC – 11
 HBO – 7
 ABC – 6
 CBS – 2
 PBS – 2

By program
 NYPD Blue (ABC) – 4

Notes

References

External links
 Emmys.com list of 1997 Nominees & Winners
 

049
Primetime Emmy Awards
1997 in California
Events in Pasadena, California
September 1997 events in the United States
20th century in Pasadena, California